The Ontario Model Parliament (OMP) was a model parliament for high school students in Ontario, Canada. The OMP was founded in 1986, much through the efforts of Dr. Paul Bennett, a former history master at Upper Canada College in Toronto. The OMP is not affiliated with any political party. OMP was ended after its thirtieth session so that it could be combined with another event to form a larger conference, OMUN.

More than 200 students participate in the OMP each year. The annual OMP commences with an "Elections Day", in which the "government" and "opposition" are established. The delegates then prepare their "legislation" for the legislative sessions held in the spring. The students convene at Queen's Park, the legislative building for Ontario. The students debate their bills as if they were real Members of Provincial Parliament (MPPs). In addition, the delegates hear from keynote speakers. In the past, such speakers have included The Hon. Elizabeth Dowdeswell (Lieutenant Governor of Ontario) in 2015, Kathleen Wynne (Premier of Ontario) in 2014, John Tory (formerly the Leader of the Opposition for Ontario and currently Mayor of Toronto), James Bartleman (formerly the Lieutenant-Governor of Ontario) and Rex Murphy (political commentator and host of Canadian Broadcasting Corporation's Cross Country Checkup). Ontario Model Parliament celebrated its 25th anniversary in 2011.

Past simulations

Dates

For 2015, the dates for OMP are the following:

Elections Day: April 7, 2015
Simulation: April 8–9, 2015

Governance

For 2015, the Ontario Model Parliament Executive included:
Chairs: Aleksei Wan
Vice Chair: James Coady
Director of Academic Programming: Nikhil Kassum
Director of Registration: Javid Karim
Director of Communications: Kinton Cheung
Director of Operations: Shakir Lakhani
Director of Delegate Services: Miles Hoaken
Secretary: Matthew Jagdeo
Head of Press Corps: Derek Lam
Faculty Adviser: Mr. Matt Griem

References

External links
OMP official website.
Upper Canada College.

Recurring events established in 1986
Politics of Ontario
Canadian youth parliaments
1986 establishments in Ontario
Educational organizations based in Ontario